Durnyam Mashurova (born 8 March 1943) is a Uyghur writer and poet from Kazakhstan. She wrote lyrics to songs performed by Dervishi, a Uyghur music band in Almaty, Kazakhstan. Durnyam Mashurova is best known for her memoirs "A Life Lived Not in Vain" describing life of her husband Azat Mashurov which were published in Uyghur in 2005. This book was translated into Russian in June, 2007. In 2009, she published a new surrealistic novel "Ana Mirasi" ("Mother's Will").

External links
"A Life Lived Not in Vain" Book Review by Dr. Lee B Croft
Durnyam Mashurova's Blog

Uyghurs
Uyghur writers
1943 births
Living people